Steve Brooks is an American former basketball player. He played college basketball for the Arkansas State Red Wolves from 1969 to 1974. He was selected by the Houston Rockets in the 1974 NBA draft but never played in the NBA.

Brooks was a native of St. Louis, Missouri. He was awarded as the Southland Conference Men's Basketball Player of the Year in 1974. Brooks was a two-time selection to the first-team all-Southland Conference in 1972 and 1974. He was selected to the second-team in 1971. Brooks did not play during the 1972–73 season.

Brooks was selected in the 8th round of the 1974 NBA draft by the Houston Rockets. He was selected in the fifth round of the 1974 ABA draft by the Utah Stars.

Brooks was named to the Southland Conference 1970s All-Decade Team in 2013.

References

External links
College statistics

Year of birth missing (living people)
Living people
American men's basketball players
Arkansas State Red Wolves men's basketball players
Basketball players from St. Louis
Centers (basketball)
Houston Rockets draft picks